Ontario is a province in east-central Canada.

Ontario may also refer ro:

Places

Belize
 Ontario, Belize, a village in Cayo District, Belize

Canada
 Ontario County, Ontario, the name of several historic counties
 Ontario (electoral district), a defunct federal electoral district
 Ontario (provincial electoral district), a defunct provincial electoral district
 Ecclesiastical Province of Ontario, an Anglican province

United States
 Ontario, California
 Ontario, Illinois
 Ontario, Indiana
 Ontario, Iowa
 Ontario, New York
 Ontario (CDP), New York
 Ontario County, New York
 Ontario, Ohio
 Ontario, Oregon
 Ontario, Wisconsin
 Ontario Township (disambiguation)

Lakes
 Lake Ontario, one of the Great Lakes on the boundary between the Canadian province of Ontario and the U.S. state of New York
 Ontario Lacus, a dark feature near the south pole of Saturn's moon Titan

Ships
 , several Canadian naval vessels
 
 , several British naval vessels
 , British warship sunk during the American Revolution
 , several American naval vessels

Other uses
 Ontario (computer virus)
 Ontario (processor), a computer APU from AMD
 Ontario International Airport (ONT) in Ontario, California
 Ontario Motor Speedway, a 2.5-mile racetrack in Ontario, California
 45554 Ontario, a British LMS Jubilee Class locomotive
 Ontario Bus Industries, the former name of Canadian bus manufacturer Orion Bus Industries

See also
 Ontarioville, Illinois